Qezel Ali (also Romanized as Qezel ‘Alī; also known as Qal‘eh Khān-e Qezī Khānom and Qizil ‘Ali) is a village in Khvor Khvoreh Rural District, in the Central District of Bijar County, Kurdistan Province, Iran. At the 2006 census, its population was 178, in 39 families. The village is populated by Kurds with an Azerbaijani minority.

References 

Towns and villages in Bijar County
Kurdish settlements in Kurdistan Province

Azerbaijani settlements in Kurdistan Province